My Fair Lady was an Australian television series which aired from 1958 to 1962 on Wednesdays on Melbourne station HSV-7. Little information is available on this series. It was originally part of a line-up titled Home, which featuring various segments including Cooking, Home Decorator and Shopping Guide. Later, it appears the Home branding was dropped. For part of its run it aired at 2:30PM. At one point in 1959 it was the first show on the station schedule for the day (this was prior to Australian television being a 24-hour service), while at another point in 1959 it was preceded by US anthology series episodes of shows like Four Star Playhouse.

The show is described as being aired live, compered by June Finlayson and featured Charles Bush, and featuring contestants, suggesting it was a game show. Other hosts during the run of the series included Vikki Hammond.

Archival status is unknown, but as Australian game shows (and daytime series in general) were rarely kept during the era the show aired in, it is likely the series is either lost or largely missing.

References

External links
 

Seven Network original programming
1958 Australian television series debuts
1962 Australian television series endings
1950s Australian game shows
1960s Australian game shows
Black-and-white Australian television shows
English-language television shows
Australian live television series
Television game shows with incorrect disambiguation